Nira Kumari Sah is a Nepalese politician. She is a member of Provincial Assembly of Madhesh Province from People's Socialist Party, Nepal. Sah is a resident of Malangwa, Sarlahi.

References

Living people
1987 births
Madhesi people
21st-century Nepalese women politicians
21st-century Nepalese politicians
Members of the Provincial Assembly of Madhesh Province
People's Socialist Party, Nepal politicians